Chase Lyman (born September 4, 1982) is a former American football wide receiver.   

Lyman was raised in Los Altos Hills, CA and is the son of former NFL player Brad Lyman.  He attended Saint Francis High School in Mountain View, California where he played football, basketball and ran track.  The San Jose Mercury News named Lyman their Male Athlete of the Year in 2000.  The San Jose Sports Hall of Fame awarded him their Outstanding Male High School Athlete of the Year in 2000.  

Despite his success in high school athletics, Lyman received only one scholarship offer, to the University of California. Lyman became a key component of the Cal offense.   In his junior year, he was a main target for Cal quarterback Aaron Rodgers.   Initially wearing #81, he later switched to #15.   He graduated with a degree in American Studies in 2004 and was drafted in the 4th round by the New Orleans Saints in 2005.  Lyman's football career was cut short by injury.  He retired after tearing his ACL for a second time.  

Lyman worked in commercial real estate with Cornish & Carey Commercial in Palo Alto, California. Since then, he has become the current Director of Commercial Real Estate at The Sobrato Organization.

1982 births
American football wide receivers
California Golden Bears football players
Living people
New Orleans Saints players
People from Mountain View, California
Players of American football from California
Sportspeople from Santa Clara County, California
People from Los Altos Hills, California